Veselin Jelušić is a Serbian football coach who is the manager of the Lesotho national team.

Career
He taught at the University of Belgrade in the 1990s.

He then managed two African national teams, Angola and Botswana. After leaving his role as Botswana manager he began working in youth development for the Botswana FA.

On 3 July 2017, Jelušić signed a two-year contract with South African club Bloemfontein Celtic. In October 2017 he was named Absa Premiership Coach of the Month.

He resigned in June 2018.

On 12 October 2020 he was unveiled as the head coach of Zambian club City of Lusaka.

In February 2022 he was appointed manager of the Lesotho national team.

References

Year of birth missing (living people)
Living people
Serbian football managers
Angola national football team managers
Botswana national football team managers
Bloemfontein Celtic F.C. managers
Lesotho national football team managers
G.D. Interclube managers
Serbian expatriate football managers
Serbian expatriate sportspeople in Angola
Expatriate football managers in Angola
Serbian expatriate sportspeople in Botswana
Expatriate football managers in Botswana
Serbian expatriate sportspeople in South Africa
Expatriate soccer managers in South Africa
Serbian expatriate sportspeople in Zambia
Expatriate football managers in Zambia
Serbian expatriate sportspeople in Lesotho
Expatriate football managers in Lesotho